Vasil Troyanov Boyanov (born 7 March 1978), professionally known as Azis, is a Bulgarian recording artist of Romani ethnicity. Azis initially rose to prominence in Eastern Europe performing songs mostly in chalga, a genre which can be described as the Bulgarian rendition of pop-folk.
Azis has collaborated with other Bulgarian pop-folk singers, such as Gloria, Malina, Sofi Marinova, Toni Storaro, and with Bulgarian rap artists – Ustata and Vanko 1. Other than that, his repertoire includes duets with Serbian singers, including Indira Radić, Marta Savić, Jelena Karleuša and Severina.

Boyanov performed "Let Me Cry" at the Eurovision Song Contest 2006 with Mariana Popova, staying in the semi-finals.

Other than his acclaimed career as a vocalist, he competed unsuccessfully in the 2005 Bulgarian parliamentary election as a member of the Euroroma party.

Azis remains a prominent figure in the Bulgarian music scene.

Biography 
Azis was born Vasil Troyanov Boyanov in Sliven, although his childhood was spent in Kostinbrod and Sofia. In 1989, after the fall of communism in Bulgaria, he moved with his family to Germany. There, his sister, Matilda, and brother Ryan were born. Azis married Nikolay "Niki Kitaetsa" Petrov Parvanov on 1 October 2006. Their marriage is not legally recognized under Bulgarian law. Azis' daughter was born on 5 August 2007 and was named Raya. Her mother is Azis' longtime friend, Gala. In 2008, Azis and Parvanov separated amicably.

Homosexuality controversies 
In late November 2007, Boyko Borisov, then mayor of Sofia, censored billboards of Azis kissing Niki Kitaetsa, which pictured both men shirtless on the basis they were too graphic in nature. The picture was then censored in other cities in Bulgaria.

In 2021, Azis was scheduled to perform at the Balkan Fair in Kestel, Bursa, Turkey, but the performance was cancelled after a campaign by Islamists targeting Azis' LGBT identity.

Appearances 

 In 2007, Azis and Kitaetsa appeared in the VIP Brother 2 edition of Big Brother Bulgaria. Azis left the house voluntarily after nineteen days.
 Azis was interviewed in the second episode of Michael Palin's New Europe.
 In 2008 on PRO.BG, Azis co-hosted the talk show Azis' Late Night Show with actress Ekaterina Evro.
 In August 2012, Anonymous used the video clip to Azis' song "Mrazish" to deface the website of the Russian court Khamovnichesky, where the members of the band Pussy Riot were convicted.
 Azis was a contestant on the widely popular reality show Kato dve kapki voda, which is the Bulgarian version of Your Face Sounds Familiar. After twelve weeks and a wide specter of highly praised and enjoyed performances, he placed second. In early 2021, he was announced as one of the returning participants in the forthcoming ninth All Stars season of the show.

Covers 
Greek laïko vocalist Panos Kiamos, made a cover of Azis' single "Sen Trope" entitled "Fotia me Fotia" (Fire to Fire). Serbian turbo-folk singer Dragan Kojić Keba covered the same song as "Ona to zna" (She Knows That), as well as the Romanian singer Florin Salam as "Saint Tropez".

In November 2012, the Greek singer Giorgos Tsalikis made a cover of Azis' song "Hop", entitled "Asto" (Let it).

International acclaim  

On 9 November 2011, a series of Azis' music videos were uploaded to Bilibili, a mainland Chinese video sharing website. The videos became extremely popular, and have been among the hottest videos on Bilibili since 2016. As of February 2020, the videos have been viewed over 21 million times and have received 788 thousand danmus (rolling comments played over the video) in total, and have received numerous covers. Thanks to "Hop", the first video of the series, where he crossdresses, Azis has become famous in the Chinese internet culture as the "保加利亚妖王 (King of coquetry of Bulgaria)" or jokingly "保加利亚妖后 (Queen of coquetry of Bulgaria)".

Discography

Studio albums

Compilation albums

EPs (Maxi singles)

Videography / Songs

DVDs 
2003: Шоу спектакъл
2004: Нищо лично
2004: The best videoclips
2004: Together with Desi Slava
2005: AZIS 2005
2005: Дуети (Duets)
2006: Аз, Азис ( I, Azis) (CD)
2007: Azis

Collaborations 
In 2011, Azis sang a duet called "Sezam" with Indira Radić, a Serbian singer, on her album Istok, sever, jug i zapad. After that, in 2012 he sang another duet with Serbian singer Marta Savić, which was featured on her studio album 13. The song was called "Mama" and it was one of Balkan hit songs in 2012. In 2022, Azis made a song "Fališ mi" with Croatian singer Severina.

Books 
 Аз, Азис (Book and CD) (2006)

References

External links 

1978 births
Living people
Bulgarian expatriates in Germany
Bulgarian pop singers
Bulgarian folk-pop singers
Bulgarian people of Romani descent
Musicians from Sliven
Romani musicians
Romani singers
Gay musicians
LGBT Romani people
Bulgarian LGBT musicians
Bulgarian television personalities
Big Brother (Bulgarian TV series) contestants
Non-binary musicians
20th-century LGBT people
21st-century LGBT people